The 1996 Conference USA baseball tournament was the 1996 postseason college baseball championship of the NCAA Division I Conference USA, held at Pete Taylor Park in Hattiesburg, Mississippi, from May 14 through 19.   won the tournament and received Conference USA's automatic bid to the 1996 NCAA Division I baseball tournament.  The tournament consisted of nine teams with a play-in game, two double-elimination brackets, and a single-game final.

Regular season results

Records listed are conference play only. Marquette and DePaul did not field baseball teams. Houston participated in the Southwest Conference for baseball.

Bracket

Play-In Game
The two teams with the worst records in regular season conference play faced each other in a single elimination situation to earn the 8th spot in the conference tournament.

Main Bracket

 Bold indicates the winner of the game.
 Italics indicate that the team was eliminated from the tournament.

Finish order

All-Tournament Team

References

Tournament
Conference USA Baseball Tournament
Conference USA baseball tournament
Conference USA baseball tournament
Hattiesburg, Mississippi
College sports tournaments in Mississippi
Baseball competitions in Mississippi